Kolhapuri is the adjective form of Kolhapur, a city in Maharashtra, India.

Kolhapuri may also refer to:
 Kolhapuri chappal, hand-crafted leather slippers
 Veg kolhapuri, a vegetarian dish from Kolhapur